Paul Anthony Bielby  (born 24 November 1956) is an English former footballer who played as a left winger. Born in Darlington, he played for Manchester United, Hartlepool United and Huddersfield Town.

He was appointed Member of the Order of the British Empire (MBE) in the 2008 New Year Honours for his services to young people.

References

1956 births
Living people
Footballers from Darlington
Association football wingers
English footballers
English Football League players
Manchester United F.C. players
Hartlepool United F.C. players
Huddersfield Town A.F.C. players
Members of the Order of the British Empire